Events in the year 1940 in Bulgaria.

Incumbents 
Monarch – Boris III

Events 

 7 September – Bulgaria regained control of Southern Dobruja under the Treaty of Craiova.
 14 December – Shipwreck of the Salvador, a ship carrying Jewish refugees to Palestine, in the Sea of Marmara. 230 of the 326 passengers died in the wreck.
 24 December – The Law for the Protection of the Nation, an anti-Jewish racial law which included banning Jews from having Bulgarian citizenship, was ratified.

Births 

 2 July – Georgi Ivan Ivanov, first Bulgarian in space.
 8 December – Alexander Yossifov, composer and conductor.

Deaths 

 23 March - Dimitar Stanchov, 15th Prime Minister of Bulgaria (b. 1863)
 10 September - Nikola Ivanov, Bulgarian general (b. 1861)
 23 December – Mariyka Popova, actress.

References 

 
1940s in Bulgaria
Years of the 20th century in Bulgaria
Bulgaria
Bulgaria